is a Japanese film, theater, and television actor. He is a member of Suzuki Matsuo's theater troupe Otona Keikaku. Minagawa generally plays boisterous and loud comedic roles, often highlighted by his large frame and obvious mutton chop sideburns. He is 170 cm tall.

Filmography

Television  
Legal High (2012) - Taihei Tokumatsu 
Resident: Story of 5 Interns (2012) - Kenji
Resident: Story of 5 Interns (2012) - Kenji
Ghost Negotiator Tenma  (2013) - Keizo Daikaku 
Amachan (2013) - Shinbei Isono 
Yoshiwara Uradoshin (2014) - Sogoro Fujimura 
Water Polo Yankees  (2014) - Toshio Iwasaki 
Bitter Blood (2014) - Kaoru Togashi 
Chushingura: A 48th Loyal Retainer in Love (2016-2017) - Zoemon Sato 
The Angel of Money (2016) - Sadao Uozumi 
Idaten (2019) - Ikkaku Matsuzawa
Your Turn to Kill (2019)

Unknown date
Saboriman Kantarou - Toru Miyake 
Grade A Reversal - Takei

Movies
Drugstore Girl (2004)
Yaji and Kita: The Midnight Pilgrims (2005)
Death Note (2006)
Pile Driver (2007) 
Climber's High (2008) - Yasuo Ito 
Hidden Fortress: The Last Princess (2008) 
A Lot of People (2009)
No More Cry!!! (2009) 
Kanikosen (2009) - job manager 
Afro Tanaka  (2012) - Shinji Nishida
Maruyama, The Middle Schooler (2013) - Hosono 
Jossy's (2014) - Kimihiko Domyoji 
The Mole Song: Undercover Agent Reiji (2014) - Doppo Fukuzumi
Bakuman (2015) - Takuro Nakai
A Farewell to Jinu (2015) - Aoto 
The Mole Song: Hong Kong Capriccio (2016) - Doppo Fukuzumi
HK2: The Abnormal Crisis (2016) 
Too Young To Die! (2016) - Junko 
Good-Bye (2020)
Fukushima 50 (2020)
Yowamushi Pedal (2020)
Mother (2020)
Your Turn to Kill: The Movie (2021)
The Mole Song: Final (2021) - Doppo Fukuzumi
 Wedding High (2022) - Shirō Inoue
 Winny (2023)

References

External links

Living people
1971 births
Actors from Fukuoka Prefecture
Japanese male film actors
Japanese male television actors